Evaniosomini is a tribe of darkling beetles in the subfamily Pimeliinae of the family Tenebrionidae. There are about eight genera in Evaniosomini, found primarily in the Neotropics.

Genera
These genera belong to the tribe Evaniosomini
 Achanius Erichson, 1847  (the Neotropics)
 Aryenis Bates, 1868  (the Neotropics)
 Chorasmius Bates, 1868  (the Neotropics)
 Evaniosomus Guérin-Méneville, 1834  (the Neotropics)
 Evelina J. Thomson, 1860  (the Neotropics)
 Melaphorus Guérin-Méneville, 1834  (the Neotropics)
 Oppenheimeria Koch, 1952  (tropical Africa)
 Vaniosus Kulzer, 1956  (the Neotropics)

References

Further reading

 
 

Tenebrionoidea